The 2018–19 Big Ten men's basketball season began with practices in October 2018, followed by the start of the 2018–19 NCAA Division I men's basketball season on November 6, 2018. The regular season ended on March 10, 2019.

The 2018–19 season marked the first time in Big Ten history that the teams played a 20-game conference schedule. The new schedule included a regional component to increase the frequency of games among teams in similar areas. Over the course of a six-year cycle (12 playing opportunities), in-state rivals will play each other 12 times, regional opponents will play 10 times, and all other teams will play nine times. Three in-state series will be guaranteed home-and-homes: Illinois and Northwestern, Indiana and Purdue, and Michigan and Michigan State will always play twice. The conference opponent list was released on April 19, 2018.

With a win over Northwestern on March 9, 2019, Purdue won a share of the Big Ten regular season championship, its conference-leading 24th championship. Later that same day, Michigan State defeated Michigan to earn a share of the championship, marking back-to-back championships for the Spartans. Due to tie-breaking rules, Michigan State received the No. 1 seed for the Big Ten tournament.

The Big Ten tournament returned to its more traditional Midwest roots and was held at the United Center in Chicago, Illinois. The Tournament was held from March 13 through March 19, 2019. Michigan State won the Big Ten tournament championship, defeating Michigan for the third time on the season in the championship game.

Michigan State guard Cassius Winston was named Big Ten Player of the Year. Purdue coach Matt Painter was named Big Ten Coach of the Year. Winston, Ethan Happ and Carsen Edwards were 2019 consensus All-Americans.

In addition to Michigan State, who received the conference's automatic bid to the NCAA tournament, the conference set a conference record by sending eight teams to the Tournament: Michigan, Purdue, Wisconsin, Maryland, Iowa, Minnesota, and Ohio State. Michigan State advanced to the Final Four.

The conference also sent two schools to the National Invitation Tournament: Indiana and Nebraska.

Head coaches

Coaching changes prior to the season
There were no coaching changes following the 2017–18 season.

Coaches

Notes: 
 All records, appearances, titles, etc. are from time with current school only. 
 Year at school includes 2018–19 season.
 Overall and Big Ten records are from time at current school and are through the beginning of the season. 
 Turgeon's ACC conference record excluded since Maryland began Big Ten Conference play in 2014–15.

Preseason

Preseason All-Big Ten 
Prior to the conference's annual media day, unofficial awards and a poll were chosen by a panel of 28 writers, two for each team in the conference. Michigan State was the consensus selection to win the conference, receiving 22 of 28 votes.

Preseason conference poll

Preseason All-Big Ten 
On October 11, 2018, a panel of conference media selected a 10-member preseason All-Big Ten Team and Player of the Year.

Preseason watchlists
Below is a table of notable preseason watch lists.

Preseason national polls

Sporting News was among the earliest of preseason polls to be released (September 20) and included Michigan (10), Michigan State (12) and Maryland (21).

Regular season

Rankings

Player of the week
Throughout the conference regular season, the Big Ten offices named one or two players of the week and one or two freshmen of the week each Monday. On December 18, Juwan Morgan earned United States Basketball Writers Association National Player of the Week recognition.

Early season tournaments 
11 of the 14 Big Ten teams participated in early season tournaments. Each team's finish is noted below. Indiana, Ohio State, and Rutgers did not participate in a tournament. Illinois, Indiana, Michigan, Nebraska, Ohio State, Penn State, Rutgers, and Wisconsin participated in the Gavitt Tip-Off Games against Big East Conference teams for a fourth consecutive year. All Big Ten teams also participated in the ACC–Big Ten Challenge against Atlantic Coast Conference teams, the 20th year for the event.

Conference matrix
This table summarizes the head-to-head results between teams in conference play. Each team will play 20 conference games, and at least one game against each opponent.

Honors and awards

All-Big Ten awards and teams
On March 11, 2019, the Big Ten announced most of its conference awards.

USBWA
On March 12, the U.S. Basketball Writers Association released its 2018–19 Men's All-District Teams, based upon voting from its national membership. There were nine regions from coast to coast, and a player and coach of the year were selected in each. The following lists all the Big Ten representatives selected within their respective regions.

District II (NY, NJ, DE, DC, PA, WV)
Lamar Stevens, Penn State

District V (OH, IN, IL, MI, MN, WI)
Player of the Year
Cassius Winston, Michigan State
Coach of the Year
Matt Painter, Purdue
All-District Team
Iggy Brazdeikis, Michigan
Carsen Edwards, Purdue
Ethan Happ, Wisconsin
Romeo Langford, Indiana
Jordan Murphy, Minnesota
Zavier Simpson, Michigan
Cassius Winston, Michigan State

District VI (IA, MO, KS, OK, NE, ND, SD)
Tyler Cook, Iowa
James Palmer Jr., Nebraska

NABC
The National Association of Basketball Coaches announced their Division I All-District teams on March 21, recognizing the nation's best men's collegiate basketball student-athletes. Selected and voted on by member coaches of the NABC, the selections on this list were then eligible for NABC Coaches' All-America Honors. The following list represented the District 7 players chosen to the list.

First Team
Cassius Winston, Michigan State
Carsen Edwards, Purdue
Ethan Happ, Wisconsin
Bruno Fernando, Maryland
Jordan Murphy, Minnesota

Second Team
Zavier Simpson, Michigan
Tyler Cook, Iowa
Anthony Cowan, Maryland
Iggy Brazdeikis, Michigan
Lamar Stevens, Penn State

Other awards
Happ, Edwards and Winston were 2019 consensus All-Americans (second team). Brazdeikis was an Associated Press All-American honorable mention selection.

Postseason

Big Ten tournament

* denotes overtime period

NCAA tournament

The winner of the Big Ten tournament, Michigan State, received the conference's automatic bid to the NCAA tournament. Eight Big Ten teams received bids to the NCAA tournament, the most of any conference in the tournament and the most in the conference's history.

National Invitation Tournament
Two Big Ten teams received invitations to the National Invitation Tournament.

References